Auraia is a village in West Champaran district in the Indian state of Bihar.

Demographics
 India census, Auraia had a population of 486 in 85 households. Males constitute 54.32% of the population and females 45.67%. Auraia has an average literacy rate of 40.25%, lower than the national average of 74%: male literacy is 44.96%, and female literacy is 55%. In Auraia, 25% of the population is under 6 years of age.

References

Villages in West Champaran district